The Bath Festival of Blues and Progressive Music was a counterculture era music festival held at the Royal Bath and West Showground in Shepton Mallet, Somerset, England on 27–29 June 1970. Bands such as Pink Floyd and Led Zeppelin performed, and the festival was widely bootlegged. An 'alternative festival' was staged in an adjoining field where the Pink Fairies and Hawkwind played on the back of a flatbed truck. 

Michael Eavis was attendant at the festival and was inspired to hold later that year the first event of what would become the Glastonbury festival of contemporary performing arts.

History
The festival started at midday on the 27th (a Saturday) and finished at about 6:30 am on Monday morning. A DJ played records for early arrivers from the Friday evening and continued to do so between many of the sets until the end. The festival featured a line-up of the top American west coast and British bands of the day, including Santana, The Flock, Led Zeppelin (headlining act), Hot Tuna, Country Joe McDonald, Colosseum, Jefferson Airplane (set aborted), The Byrds (acoustic set), The Moody Blues (unable to play), Dr. John (acoustic set), Frank Zappa & The Mothers of Invention, Canned Heat, It's a Beautiful Day, Steppenwolf,  Johnny Winter, John Mayall with Peter Green, Pink Floyd, Pentangle, Fairport Convention, Keef Hartley, and the Maynard Ferguson Big Band. This line-up was approaching the level of the more famous Isle of Wight festival held in August of the same year. As it attracted less press coverage at the time and was a smaller affair, it has generally received less attention in the years since.

Bath was the brainchild of promoter Freddy Bannister and his wife Wendy Bannister, who had held the smaller Bath Festival of Blues within Bath itself in 1969. The 1970 show attracted a significantly larger crowd of 150,000, but, like the Isle of Wight festival, an audience of such magnitude created some serious on-ground difficulties. The logistics proved to be too vast for Bannister's small team to adequately cope with, and his security staff stole large amounts of gate receipts, resulting in a far smaller profit than expected.

Actually getting to the festival itself was another problem for many of the throng of fans. The country lanes leading to the site were swiftly blocked by cars, also meaning that many of the bands' equipment trucks could not get to the site. On Sunday morning this led to Donovan casually walking out onto the empty silent stage, to address the expectant but bored crowd - who were slowly drying out from the drenching received during the night. Being a folk singer, his genre was not what the crowd had gone there to hear. So to test the mood of the crowd out, he engaged in a bit of small talk, where he explained that he had spent the night in his van in a nearby field and so on. Then worked around to asking if they would like him to play a song whilst they waited for the billed act to arrive. A lively rendering  of "I know an old lady who swallowed a fly" raised the crowd's spirits. Then he played some of his classics. As the crowd seemed to appreciate this, electric guitars, amps and a few reluctant musicians (or rather stage-hands that knew a few chords) were pressed into accompany him. Still no bands came, so Donovan continued. His impromptu and free performance eventually filled in for 2½ hours of what otherwise would have been silence.

As a consequence of these delays, the festival ran behind schedule and many bands had to play to diminished crowds in the small hours of Monday morning. The last act, Dr John, hit the stage at dawn on Monday.

The festival featured many innovations, including projections of the bands on screens on the side of the stage, a good quality PA system, on-site tents for the patrons to sleep in and larger tents which projected films such as King Kong throughout the night. The expenditure on these items ate into the profits, and many people decamped with the tents, which were hired. This was another expense that had to be borne by the promoters.

The festival was captured on both film and on video, in varying quality, but a lack of post-festival organisation led to the footage being lost for many years. Much of it has now been recovered, but the black-and-white footage is of poor quality and is in many different hands.  It is considered unlikely that it will ever see the light of day as a legitimate release since no-one can agree on who owns the copyright. This situation could be contrasted to the Isle of Wight Festival, which was professionally recorded and filmed in colour.

The festival was widely bootlegged, and several audience tapes are now in circulation. It is rumoured that excellent soundboard tapes also exist, though to this point they have not publicly surfaced.

An 'alternative festival' was staged in an adjoining field where the Pink Fairies and Hawkwind played on the back of a flatbed truck. This was a precursor to the many free festivals of the 1970s.

Jefferson Airplane performance
The festival also suffered from inclement weather on the Sunday night, with Jefferson Airplane being rained off halfway through their set and The Moody Blues not playing at all due to the wet stage.

"Volunteers"
"Somebody to Love"
"The Other Side of This Life"
"Won't You Try/Saturday Afternoon"
"3/5 of a Mile in 10 Seconds"
"Rock Me Baby"
"The Ballad of You and Me and Pooneil"

Led Zeppelin performance

Led Zeppelin accepted an offer from Bannister to headline for a fee of £20,000. They took to the stage at about 8:30 pm, as the sun was setting. The performance is considered by critics, and the band, as one of the most important of their career, representing a turning point in the recognition they received in Great Britain (until that point their on-stage success and popularity had largely been borne out on numerous United States concert tours). It was also one of the largest crowds the band performed to; well over 200,000 people were estimated at the time they took the stage. "Although we were about eight miles away from the stage," recalled Saxon's Biff Byford, "I'll never forget Jimmy Page playing guitar with a bow."

Led Zeppelin played for three hours. The setlist was:

"Immigrant Song" (debut live performance)
"Heartbreaker"
"Dazed and Confused"
"Bring It On Home"
"Since I've Been Loving You"
"Thank You"
"That's the Way"
"What Is and What Should Never Be"
"Moby Dick"
"How Many More Times"
"Whole Lotta Love"
"Communication Breakdown"
Classic Rock Medley ("Long Tall Sally" - "Say Mama" - "Johnny B. Goode" - "That's Alright Mama")

Pink Floyd performance
At the concert, Pink Floyd premiered their new suite, "Atom Heart Mother", which at that time was announced as "The Amazing Pudding". The performance featured a complete brass band and 12 strong choir, and took place at 3 am, due to major delays. As well as the Atom Heart Mother suite, the band also played tracks from More, A Saucerful of Secrets as well as "Careful with That Axe, Eugene". The band's set list from the show is as follows:
"Green Is the Colour" (Waters)
"Careful with That Axe, Eugene" (Waters, Gilmour, Wright, Mason)
"A Saucerful of Secrets" (Waters, Gilmour, Wright, Mason)
"Set the Controls for the Heart of the Sun" (Waters)
"The Amazing Pudding" (also known as "Atom Heart Mother") (Waters, Gilmour, Wright, Mason, Geesin)

Their performance also marked the first public appearance of Gilmour's 1969 Fender Stratocaster, which would later become synonymous with both his image and tone.

See also
List of historic rock festivals
List of blues festivals

References

External links

History of Bath Festival
British Seventies Rock Festivals
Bath Festival Programme 1970 (Led Zeppelin extract)
Replica posters and Memorabilia 

Music festivals in Somerset
Rock festivals in England
Folk festivals in the United Kingdom
1970 in England
Counterculture festivals
Blues festivals in the United Kingdom
Shepton Mallet
Electronic music festivals in the United Kingdom
Music festivals established in 1970
20th century in Somerset
1970 music festivals